The concept car was introduced in October 2017 at the Gran Turismo booth during the 45th Tokyo Motor Show. It is part of the Vision Gran Turismo and is inspired by the Iso Rivolta, a coupe that Iso produced from 1962 to 1970. It is designed by Italian coach builder Zagato and the concept car uses a 6.2 liter V8 from Callaway. The original car from the 1960s also used an American powertrain: a Chevrolet V8 engine. Zagato was open to start producing the car in very limited numbers and had reportedly open a short list for potential buyers.

References 

Sports cars

Gran Turismo (series)
Coupés
Cars introduced in 2017